Luboš Loučka (born 25 August 1982) is a Czech former professional footballer who played as a defender, most recently for Neugersdorf.

He was a Sparta Prague trainee, but did not break into the first team. In summer 2003 was loaned to SFC Opava. A year later Loučka went to FK Jablonec 97 where he scored his first goal in the Czech 1. Gambrinus league in the match against FC Viktoria Plzeň on 28 August 2005.

Sparta bought him back in summer 2005 for €250 000.

External links
 Profile at iDNES.cz

1982 births
Living people
Czech footballers
Czech First League players
AC Sparta Prague players
FK Jablonec players
SFC Opava players
Association football midfielders
FC Oberlausitz Neugersdorf players
People from Chrudim
Czech football managers
Expatriate footballers in Germany
Czech expatriate sportspeople in Germany
Sportspeople from the Pardubice Region